Sample is an unincorporated community within Breckinridge County, Kentucky, United States. It was also known as Chicken Bristle.

History

This community, which was located on the CSX Railroad line, north of Hardinsburg, was originally named "Chicken Bristle" because of the famous cockfights which were held there. People came from many other states and as far away as Chicago and New York City to attend the fights.

The Sample post office closed in 1992. The origin of the name "Sample" is obscure.

References

Unincorporated communities in Breckinridge County, Kentucky
Unincorporated communities in Kentucky